This is a list of electoral division results for the Australian 2004 federal election in the state of Tasmania.

Overall results

Results by division

Bass

Braddon

Denison

Franklin

Lyons

See also 

 Results of the 2004 Australian federal election (House of Representatives)
 Members of the Australian House of Representatives, 2004–2007

References 

Tasmania 2004